Kristof Trouvé (born 11 August 1976 in Deinze) is a Belgian former professional road cyclist. He won the Crystal Bicycle for Best Young Rider in 1994.

Major results

1994
 1st  Road race, National Junior Road Championships
 1st Overall Keizer der Juniores
 3rd Ronde van Vlaanderen Juniors
1996
 1st Stage 3 Tour du Loir-et-Cher
 1st Stage 3 OZ Wielerweekend
 2nd Liège–Bastogne–Liège U23
 4th Schaal Sels
1997
 1st Seraing-Aachen-Seraing
2000
 1st  Mountains classification, Circuit Franco-Belge
 7th Omloop van de Vlaamse Scheldeboorden
2001
 2nd GP Rudy Dhaenens
 4th Tour Beneden-Maas
 5th Overall Circuit Franco-Belge
 6th Grote Prijs Jef Scherens
 6th GP Rik Van Steenbergen
2003
 6th GP Stad Zottegem
 6th Vlaamse Havenpijl
 10th Omloop van het Waasland
2004
 9th Grand Prix S.A.T.S.
 9th Omloop van de Vlaamse Scheldeboorden
2005
 7th De Drie Zustersteden

References

External links

1976 births
Living people
Belgian male cyclists
People from Deinze
Cyclists from East Flanders